Golden Wings Aviation South Sudan , is a privately owned airline based in Juba, South Sudan. The carrier operates as a regional affiliate of South African carrier, Golden Wings Aviation, under a South African Air Operator's Certificate.

History
Golden Wings Aviation was founded in 2014 by Obac William Olawo, a South Sudanese businessman from Upper Nile state as a South Sudanese start-up. The company successfully launched domestic flights between the South Sudanese capital of Juba and Wau, the capital of the Western Bahr el Ghazal state, using a Fokker 70 wet-leased from South Africa's SKA Aviation. Managing director, Obaj William Olau, said the route would operate four times weekly.

At the time of opening, the new airline intended to establish additional domestic flights to Malakal, Yei, and Aweil with regional services to Entebbe International Airport in Uganda, also planned in the future. Due to the present turmoil in the country is seen as a bonus to local airlines as travelers opt for air transport over road transport to avoid ambushes, besides many of the key trunk roads across the South Sudan still being in poor state.

Company news

On July 16, 2015, it was announced that Golden Wings would lease a Yak-42D Skyliner Aviation from Moldovan ACMI/charter specialist, MEGAviation, to expand service. At that time, the airline had expanded charter and scheduled services to Palouch, Malakal, Wau, Yaida, Aweil, Yambio, and Rumbek, all in South Sudan. Services to Khartoum in neighboring Sudan were also available.

In July, Golden Wings also announced that it has been named as the official franchise holder for Million Air, an award-winning fixed base organisation in the United States. Talks are now underway that could see the firm utilize the Million Air name and brand for various projects at various airports in South Africa and across the continent as a whole.

On February 15, 2016, it was announced Golden Wings was expanding their operations from originally focusing on South Sudan to exploring new opportunities in Ghana, Nigeria and Uganda amongst various other African countries. At this point, Golden Wings Aviation’s fleet has grown rapidly and now consisted of 12 aircraft. The company possesses a Fokker F70, a 75-seater regional jet liner powered by two Rolls-Royce TAY 620-15 engines, two Beechcraft 1900Ds, regional turboprop airliners powered by two Pratt & Whitney PT6A67Ds and two de Havilland Dash 8 Q300s. A C-208 Caravan was later added to their fleet, and Golden Wings also manages a Boeing 727 Freighter for SKA International and was expected to add a 100-seater VVIP aircraft, as of February 2017.

On May 25, 2016, the company announced it was closing down operations in Bor, Panyangor, Pibor, Yei and Yambio following the rising inflation rates. Other destinations which were discontinued included Asmara, Cairo and Nairobi.

In July 2016, the airline began services to Entebbe International Airport in neighboring Uganda.

Destinations
, Golden Wings Aviation serves the following destinations:

Current destinations

Future and discontinued destinations

Fleet
As of October 2017 the Golden Wings Aviation fleet consisted of the following aircraft:

The GWASS – Golden Wings Aviation South Sudan fleet previously included the following aircraft (as of 9 October 2017):

1 Fokker 50 - 58 max cap. Leased from SKA South Africa.

References

External links
Website if Golden Wings Aviation South Sudan

Airlines of South Sudan
Airlines established in 2014
2014 establishments in South Sudan
Companies based in Juba